Xerri's Grotto is a cave in Xagħra, Gozo, Malta. It was discovered by local resident Anthony Xerri in 1923 or 1924 while digging a well under a private house. Xerri's Grotto is not far from another underground feature, Ninu's Cave.

The grotto is larger than Ninu's Cave. It contains various calcified formations, including stalactites and stalagmites, some of which resemble a tortoise, a vulture, giraffes or elephant's ears. Some other formations which developed as a result of the calcification of tree roots can also be seen.

The entrance to the cave is down a 10m spiral staircase, built into the original well shaft. The cave was extended during World War II when the family used it as an air raid shelter.

Today, the cave is illuminated by electric lights, and is open to the public with tours being given by the owners of the house.

References

Caves of Malta
Limestone caves
Air raid shelters
Xagħra